Tolidostena is a genus of beetles in the family Mordellidae, containing the following species:

Subgenus Neotolidostena Kiyoyama, 1991
Tolidostena hayashii (Kiyoyama, 1991)
Tolidostena taiwana (Kiyoyama, 1987)
Subgenus Tolidostena Ermisch, 1942
Tolidostena atripennis Nakane, 1956
Tolidostena ermischi Nakane, 1956
Tolidostena fusei (Tokeji)
Tolidostena japonica (Tokeji, 1953)
Tolidostena montana Kiyoyama, 1991
Tolidostena similator Kiyoyama, 1991
Tolidostena tarsalis Ermisch, 1942

References

Mordellidae